Roar Berthelsen (3 November 1934 – 1 August 1990) was a Norwegian long jumper. He represented Mandal og Halse IL and IK Tjalve.
 
At the 1954 European Championships he finished eleventh in the long jump final with a jump of 7.16 metres. He also competed at the 1960 Summer Olympics without qualifying for the final. He became Norwegian champion in long jump in 1954, 1956, 1957 and 1959.

His personal best jump was 7.62 metres, achieved in August 1959 at Bislett stadion. This places him thirteenth among Norwegian long jumpers.

References

External links
 

1934 births
1990 deaths
Norwegian male long jumpers
Athletes (track and field) at the 1960 Summer Olympics
Olympic athletes of Norway
20th-century Norwegian people